Briceburg (formerly, Bear Creek) is an unincorporated community in Mariposa County, California. It is accessed via a bridge over the Merced River that connects Highway 140 with Briceburg Road. The bridge is a  suspension bridge built by the US Forest Service in 1937 and constructed by 30 Civilian Conservation Corps enrollees. Forest Service Engineer J.W. Nute was in charge of construction. The community name honors William M. Brice, who built a store at the location in 1926.

After a 2019 fire, Pacific Gas & Electric decided to create a self-reliant power system rather than rebuilding poles and wires to serve the remote community. The stand-alone power grid includes solar panels, batteries and a backup generator.

References

Unincorporated communities in California
Unincorporated communities in Mariposa County, California